Chrysodeixis illuminata is a moth of the family Noctuidae. It is found across south-east Asia and the southern Pacific, including Fiji, Papua New Guinea, Timor, New Caledonia, Borneo, the Cook Islands, Queensland, the Chagos Archipelago and Samoa.

Adults are predominantly grey or pale brown in colour, with dark brown patches and a white blotch near the centre of each forewing. The hindwings are a uniform brown, fading toward the base. There are bunched hairs on the thorax.

External links
Australian Faunal Directory
Australian Insects
Image at Moths of Fiji
The Moths of Borneo

Moths of Australia
Plusiinae
Moths of Asia
Moths of Oceania
Moths described in 1968